Jannasch is a German surname. Notable people with this surname include the following:
  Holger W. Jannasch (1927-1998), German microbiologist for whom the genus Jannaschia was named
 Lilli Jannasch (1872–1968), German feminist, pacifist, journalist and graphologist
 Niels Jannasch (1924–2001), German-Canadian mariner and marine historian
 Wilhelm Jannasch (1888–1966), German Protestant theologian and clergyman

German-language surnames
Surnames from given names